The 1992 Miami Hurricanes football team represented the University of Miami during the 1992 NCAA Division I-A football season. It was the Hurricanes' 67th season of football and second as a member of the Big East Conference. The Hurricanes were led by fourth-year head coach Dennis Erickson and played their home games at the Orange Bowl. They finished the season 11–1 overall and 4–0 in the Big East while playing a partial conference schedule. They were invited to the Sugar Bowl, which served as the Bowl Coalition National Championship Game, where they lost to Alabama, 34–13.

Personnel

Coaching staff

Support staff

Roster

Schedule

Rankings

Season summary

Iowa

Florida State

vs. Alabama (Sugar Bowl)

Awards and honors
Gino Torretta, Davey O'Brien Award
Gino Torretta, Heisman Trophy
Gino Torretta, Johnny Unitas Golden Arm Award
Gino Torretta, Maxwell Award
Gino Torretta, Walter Camp Award

Jack Harding University of Miami MVP Award
Michael Barrow, LB
Gino Torretta, QB

1993 NFL Draft

References

Miami
Miami Hurricanes football seasons
Miami Hurricanes football